Eleocharis parvula is a species of spikesedge known by the common names dwarf spikerush, small spikerush and hairgrass in aquaria. It is a plant of brackish and saltwater habitat, such as marshes and mudflats. It is a perennial herb growing tufts of spongy, compressible stems not more than 10 centimeters tall. The plant grows from a tuber which is J-shaped or horseshoe-shaped, a characteristic that helps in the identification of the species.<ref>[http://www.efloras.org/florataxon.aspx?flora_id=1&taxon_id=242357778 Flora of North America, Eleocharis parvula']</ref> The inflorescence is an oval-shaped spikelet just 2 or 3 millimeters long, made up of several tiny flowers.

DistributionEleocharis parvula'' has a disjunct, scattered distribution. It is widespread across much of Europe and North America (US, Canada, Mexico, Central America), with additional populations in the Russian Far East, Japan, Hainan, Java, Vietnam, Kazakhstan, Uzbekistan, Venezuela, Cuba, and Brazil.

References

External links
Jepson Manual Treatment
Photo gallery

parvula
Flora of North America
Flora of South America
Flora of Central America
Flora of Europe
Flora of Asia
Flora of Cuba
Plants described in 1817
Flora without expected TNC conservation status